Astylus trifasciatus is a species of beetles native to Chile. Adult specimens are approximately 1.5 cm in length. They have orange-colored elytra with a black stripe down the center bisecting the insect and two black stripes trisecting the wing shells. They feed on flowering plants, and are known to forage pollen from the orchid Bipinnula fimbriata.

References

External links
Astylus trifasciatus at entomologia.cl
Photo at insectos.cl 

Melyridae
Fauna of Chile
Beetles described in 1844
Beetles of South America
Endemic fauna of Chile